The 1983 Gloucester City Council election took place on 5 May 1983 to elect members of Gloucester City Council in England.

Results 

|}

Ward results

Barnwood

Barton

Eastgate

Hucclecote

Kingsholm

Linden

Longlevens

Matson

Podsmead

Tuffley

Westgate

References

1983 English local elections
1983
1980s in Gloucestershire